Poul Andersen may refer to:

 Poul Andersen (resistance member) (1922–2006), printer, publisher and Danish resistance member
 Poul Andersen (footballer, born 1928) (1928–2010), Danish footballer
 Poul Andersen (footballer, born 1930) (1930–1995), Danish footballer
 Poul Andersen (footballer, born 1953), Danish footballer

See also
Poul Anderson (1926–2001), American science fiction author
Paul Anderson (disambiguation)